Dana Klisanin is a psychologist, futurist, and game designer. She is known for her research and writing in the field of digital altruism, and the impact of the digital era on heroism.

Education 

Klisanin graduated from Arkansas Tech University in 2003 with a B.A. in psychology. She holds a Ph.D. in psychology from Saybrook University. At Saybrook she studied evolutionary systems design with Bela H. Banathy.  She also worked with humanistic psychologist, Stanley Krippner.

Career 

While attending Saybrook University, Klisanin began researching the potential of Information and Communication Technology (ICTs) to promote the development of higher stages of human consciousness and planetary flourishing. She applied systems science and design theories and methodologies to design an impact media framework. Later, she began investigating the positive uses of the Internet and exploring "digital altruism", which she defined as "altruism mediated by digital technology", and divided it into three categories: everyday digital altruism, creative digital altruism, and co-creative digital altruism.

In 2009, after studying the characteristics of people who engaged in digital altruism, Klisanin defined a new form of the hero archetype, the "cyberhero", an individual who repeatedly uses digital technology to help other people, animals, and the planet, by contributing to world peace, social justice, environmental protection, and/or planetary stewardship.

In 2010, Klisanin applied Ken Wilber's integral theory, to her previous media framework, which she called "Integral media", and defined as the "conscious creation, use, and evaluation of media that aims to guide the evolutionary development of the body, mind, and spirit, in self, culture, and nature."

In 2012, Klisanin received the Early Career Award for Scientific Achievement in Media Psychology from the Media Psychology division of the American Psychological Association for her research in positive media, digital altruism, and the cyberhero archetype. In 2017, she received the President's Outstanding Women Futures Award from the World Futures Studies Federation, for advancement of the philosophies, theories, methods and practices that strengthen and enrich the field of futures studies.

Klisanin serves on the News Media, Public Education and Public Policy Committee, and the Media Watch Video Game Committee for the American Psychological Association's Division of Media Psychology.

Current projects 
Klisanin is researching "collaborative heroism", a form of heroism taking place in the situation of cloud computing in which individuals collaborate to achieve noble goals such as the articles of the Universal Declaration of Human Rights and the Earth Charter. She is designing and developing an interactive adventure game, Cyberhero League, designed to promote the cyberhero archetype in society. The game, selected as a winner of the World Future Society's BetaLaunch Technology competition, enables players to learn about and tackle global challenges through completing apprenticeships with partnering nonprofit organizations.  She is the founder and CEO of Evolutionary Guidance Media R&D, Inc. and director of the MindLab at the Center for Conscious Creativity.

Selected publications
  "Heroism in the Networked Society". Handbook of Heroism and Heroic Leadership. Edited by Scott T. Allison. New York: Routledge. (2017).
  "Collaborative heroism: An empirical investigation". Heroism Science, 1 (1), 1-14. (2016).    
  "The Hero and the Internet: Exploring the Emergence of the Cyberhero Archetype". Media Psychology Review. (2012).
  "Exploring the design of conscious media". Futures. 42 (10), 1119-1125. . (2010).
  "Postformal-Integral-Planetary Scholarship: Insights from the Integral Futures Controversy". Journal of Integral Theory and Practice. 6 (2). 149-156. (2011).
  "Evolutionary Guidance Media: An Integral Framework for Foresight Communication". Journal of Futures Studies. 17 (1). 99-106. (2012).
  "A grand synergy: Applying the integral operating system to evolutionary guidance media". Journal of Integral Theory and Practice. 5 (4). (2010).
  "Archetypes of Change in a Digital Age", The Noetic Post, Institute of Noetic Sciences.
  "Is the Internet giving rise to new forms of Altruism?" Media Psychology Review. (2011).
  "Transception: The Dharma of Evolutionary Guidance Media". In J. Wilby (ed), Integrated Systems Sciences: Systems Thinking, Modeling and Practice. Proceedings of the 51st Annual Conference of the International Society for the Systems Sciences, Tokyo, Japan. (2007).

References

External links
Cyberhero League
Google Scholar report

Year of birth missing (living people)
Living people